Dieuches notatus is a species of dirt-colored seed bug in the family Rhyparochromidae found in Australia and New Zealand.

References

External links

 

Rhyparochromidae
Hemiptera of Oceania
Insects described in 1852